Vinko Golob (April 22, 1921 – September 5, 1995) was a Bosnian-Herzegovinian football player.

International career
He made his debut for Yugoslavia in a June 1948 Balkan Cup match against Albania, which remained his sole international appearance.

References

External links

 
 Profile at Playerhistory 
 Vinko Golob at enciclopediadeicalcio.it

1921 births
1995 deaths
People from Bileća
Association football forwards
Bosnia and Herzegovina footballers
Yugoslav footballers
Yugoslavia international footballers
NK Varaždin players
HŠK Concordia players
GNK Dinamo Zagreb players
Bohemians 1905 players
Toulouse FC (1937) players
Venezia F.C. players
Yugoslav First League players
Ligue 1 players
Serie A players
Yugoslav expatriate footballers
Expatriate footballers in Czechoslovakia
Yugoslav expatriate sportspeople in Czechoslovakia
Expatriate footballers in France
Yugoslav expatriate sportspeople in France
Expatriate footballers in Italy
Yugoslav expatriate sportspeople in Italy
Vigevano Calcio players